Rail Heritage WA is the local trading name of the Australian Railway Historical Society (Western Australian Division) Inc.

History
The Western Australian branch of the Australian Railway Historical Society was formed in February 1959. In the 1960s the Western Australian Government Railways placed its collection of historical items on loan, later donating the collection in 1992. In November 1974, a museum was opened on land donated by CSBP & Farmers. While its collection is primarily rolling stock that operated in Western Australia, it does have examples from other systems.

It is the owner and manager of the Bassendean based Western Australian Rail Transport Museum. It conducts annual RailFest's (some times designated "Steamfest" if locomotives are active) at the Bassendean museum.

In the past the society conducted extensive rail tours - especially in the late 1960s in the final years of steam operation in Western Australia.

It regularly produces materials that celebrate centenaries and other anniversaries for parts of the Western Australian railway network.

It also has contracted consultants for submissions on railway heritage issues in Perth and Western Australia.

The current President is Philippa Rogers, who took over the role from Brian Williams in early-2021.

Publications
It publishes books and pamphlets relative to Western Australian railway history.
Recent publication by the organisation include:
 Higham, Geoffrey (2007) Marble Bar to Mandurah, A History of passenger rail services in Western Australia 
 Gunzburg, Adrian (2008) Rails in the Bush
 Gray, Bill (2010) Guide to the collection : The Railway Museum, Western Australia 

It has also published a regular magazine The Westland (sometimes The Westland Express and The Westlander.

References

External links 

Rail Heritage WA

Rail transport preservation in Australia
1959 establishments in Australia
Rail transport in Western Australia